Romea may refer to:

 Romea (yacht)
 Alberto Romea, Spanish actor
 Justino Romea, Filipino composer, writer, director, musical arranger, poet and journalist
Teatre Romea, a Barcelona theatre founded in 1863

See also 
 Romeas
 Romeo